Rufus James Marshall (born May 25, 1931) is an American former professional baseball player, manager and coach. He spent five full years in Major League Baseball as a first baseman, outfielder and pinch hitter for five teams from  through . Then he played in Japan (with the Chunichi Dragons) from 1963 to 1965. After his playing career, Marshall managed the Chicago Cubs (1974–76) and the Oakland Athletics (1979) but never enjoyed a winning season in either post. His career big-league managing record was 229–326 (.413) and his 1979 A's squad lost 108 of 162 games (.333).

Playing career
Marshall attended Long Beach State University. After beginning his professional career in 1950, he was a productive hitter during his minor league days in the Pacific Coast League of the 1950s, leading the PCL in home runs (31) and runs batted in (123) as a member of the 1954 Oakland Oaks.

Marshall appeared in 410 MLB games over five seasons (1958–62) and batted .242 with 206 hits and 29 home runs. He recorded a career .994 fielding percentage, committing only nine errors in 1,602 total chances. He was part of the first interleague trade (without  waivers) in baseball history when he was dealt by the Cubs with pitcher Dave Hillman to the Boston Red Sox for first baseman Dick Gernert on November 21, 1959.

In addition to the Cubs, he played for the Baltimore Orioles, San Francisco Giants, New York Mets and Pittsburgh Pirates. He never appeared in an official game for the Red Sox, who traded him (in a waiver deal) to the Giants for pitcher Al Worthington during spring training in 1960.

During his three full seasons in Nippon Professional Baseball, Marshall hit 78 home runs in 408 games.

Management career
Marshall became a minor league manager in the Cubs' organization in 1968.

On July 25, with Chicago at 41–52, he replaced Lockman as manager. The Cubs went 25–44 over the remainder of the season to finish at 66–96, sixth and last in the National League East Division. His contract was not renewed, and he was replaced by Herman Franks on November 24, 1976.

He managed at Triple-A for the Montreal Expos and Oakland organizations in 1977–78 before landing his second MLB command with the 1979 Athletics.  Marshall concluded his managerial career  in minor league baseball during the 1980s, working for the New York Yankees (1984) and Chicago White Sox (1986). After his managerial career ended, Marshall scouted the United States for Japanese league teams. He remains in the game as the senior advisor for Pacific Rim operations of the Arizona Diamondbacks.

References

External links

Jim Marshall - Baseballbiography.com

1931 births
Living people
Albuquerque Dukes players
American expatriate baseball players in Japan
Arizona Diamondbacks executives
Arizona Diamondbacks scouts
Baltimore Orioles players
Baseball players from Illinois
Baseball players from Long Beach, California
Buffalo Bisons (minor league) managers
Chicago Cubs coaches
Chicago Cubs managers
Chicago Cubs players
Chunichi Dragons players
Long Beach Polytechnic High School alumni
Major League Baseball first basemen
Major League Baseball third base coaches
Memphis Chickasaws players
Minor league baseball managers
Nashville Sounds managers
Nashville Vols players
New York Mets players
Oakland Athletics managers
Oakland Oaks (baseball) players
People from Danville, Illinois
Pittsburgh Pirates players
San Antonio Missions managers
San Francisco Giants players
Vancouver Mounties players
Wenatchee Chiefs players